Baton Baton Mein is a 1979 Indian romantic comedy film, produced and directed by Basu Chatterjee. The film stars Amol Palekar and Tina Munim in leading roles. David, Pearl Padamsee, Asrani and Ranjit Choudhary appear in supporting roles.

The film's music is by Rajesh Roshan. At least three of the four songs became quite popular. The movie was a critical and commercial success.

The popular song "Na bole Tum Na" is a rendition from the American Civil War song "When Johnny Comes Marching Home".

Plot
Rosie Perreira is an overly anxious widow, living with her violin-obsessed son, Sabby and a lovely daughter, Nancy whom she would like to marry a wealthy young man. Her brother and neighbour, Tom introduces a young eligible Tony Braganza to Nancy on the 9:10 AM Western Railway local train from Bandra to Churchgate. Tom also asks Nancy to introduce Tony to Rosie, which she does. Rosie is initially apprehensive about him as he only drawing a mere Rs.300/- compared to Nancy's Rs.700/-, but soon changes her mind when she finds out that after his probationary period he will draw a monthly pay of Rs.1,000/-. Nancy and Tony are permitted to meet and both eventually fall in love. While Nancy has a past where she was betrayed by a boy whom she loved, she still likes Tony. Tony is hesitant, and this is what costs him Nancy's love, as Rosie feels that he will not come through with the marriage. And soon Rosie starts looking elsewhere for a son-in-law. Nancy does not like this, but she at first accepts her mum's wishes. Nancy and Tony have a fight and stop meeting each other on the train as well. When Tom learns about this, he speaks to Tony's father. Tony's father tells Tony that if he is still reluctant to make a commitment, he should tell Nancy about it. So Nancy and Tony meet each other and Nancy tells him that she will never meet him again. It is then that Tony feels that he actually loves Nancy and cannot live without her. Then Nancy also confesses her love for him and they marry.

Cast
 Amol Palekar as Tony Braganza
 Tina Munim as Nancy Perreira 
 Asrani as Francis Fernandes
 David as Tom Uncle
 Leela Mishra as Philomena Aunty
 Pearl Padamsee as Rosie Perreira
 Arvind Deshpande as Mr. Braganza
 Piloo J. Wadia as Mrs. Braganza
 Ranjit Chowdhry as Sabby Perreira
 Uday Chandra as Henry
 Shobhini Singh as Hazel Pinto

Music
All music was composed by Rajesh Roshan and the lyrics were by Yogesh and Amit Khanna. Music for the song Na Bole Tum, Na Maine Kuch Kaha is lifted from Johnny, I Hardly Knew Ye by Clancy Brothers & Tommy Makem.

Reception
In a retrospective review, Vijay Lokapally of The Hindu praised the film's realism and stated that it "surely lifts your spirit". Writing for the Indian Express, Sampada Sharma found the complications in Tony and Nancy's romance to be representative of present woes in modern relationships. Komal RJ Panchal of the Indian Express saw the film as a look at the daily lives of Mumbaiites and commended the non-stereotypical depiction of the Christian community in Bandra.

References

External links

1979 films
1970s Hindi-language films
Films directed by Basu Chatterjee
1979 romantic comedy films
Films scored by Rajesh Roshan
Films set in Mumbai